Gamharia Junction railway station is a railway station on Howrah–Nagpur–Mumbai line under Chakradharpur railway division of South Eastern Railway zone. It is situated at Gamharia, Seraikela Kharsawan district in the Indian state of Jharkhand.

Most trains are westbound and northbound but none of the train originate at Gamharia Junction railway station. It handles 26 trains daily.

The Howrah–Mumbai main line and the Tatanagar–Asansol line diverge from here.

References

Railway stations in Seraikela Kharsawan district
Chakradharpur railway division